Ágúst Ævar Gunnarsson (born 22 September 1976) is a founding member of the Icelandic post-rock band Sigur Rós. He was the band's drummer from their creation in August 1994 until he quit in 1999 after the band finished Ágætis byrjun. Orri Páll Dýrason took his place as drummer. The group became internationally popular with their subsequent albums, (2002) and Takk... (2005). He went on to study graphic design.

References

Living people
Agust Aevar Gunnarsson
Agust Aevar Gunnarsson
Rock drummers
Agust Aevar Gunnarsson
1976 births
21st-century drummers